The 1999 FIBA EuroLeague Final Four was the 1998–99 season's FIBA EuroLeague Final Four tournament, organized by FIBA Europe.

Žalgiris won its first title after defeating Kinder Bologna in the final game.

Bracket

Semifinals

Teamsystem Bologna – Kinder Bologna

Žalgiris – Olympiacos

Third Place Game

Final

Awards

FIBA EuroLeague Final Four MVP 
 Tyus Edney ( Žalgiris Kaunas)

FIBA EuroLeague Finals Top Scorer 
 Antoine Rigaudeau (Virtus Bologna)

FIBA EuroLeague All-Final Four Team

References

External links 
EuroLeague 1998–99 at FIBA Europe website
EuroLeague at Linguasport

1999
International basketball competitions hosted by Germany
1998–99 in European basketball
1998–99 in German basketball
1998–99 in Italian basketball
1998–99 in Greek basketball
1998–99 in Lithuanian basketball